Constantin "Titi" Gheorghe Mihail  (July 24, 1945 – January 22, 2016) was a Romanian track and field coach. He is considered one of the most important promoters of male sprinting, hurdling, long jump and triple jump events. Mihail had a significant role in restructuring the Romanian Athletics Federation in the post-communist period.

References 

Romanian athletics coaches
2016 deaths
Recipients of the National Order of Faithful Service
1945 births
Sportspeople from Constanța